Taxi 3 is a 2003 French action comedy film directed by Gérard Krawczyk. Starring Samy Naceri, Frédéric Diefenthal and Marion Cotillard, it is the sequel to Taxi 2, and was followed by Taxi 4. It is the third installment in the Taxi film series.

Plot

A group of thieves calling themselves the Santa Claus gang are wreaking havoc, using Santa Claus costumes to commit heists, and the Marseille police are, as usual, unable to keep up. Superintendent Gibert (played by Bernard Farcy) is distracted by a Chinese journalist (Bai Ling) writing a story on his squad, and is unable to stop the robbers.

Detective Emilien's wife, Petra, has just announced that she's pregnant and taxi driver Daniel (Samy Naceri) is in the midst of a relationship crisis. His long-suffering girlfriend Lilly has walked out on him after finding him customising his taxi at four o'clock in the morning, and complaining that their house has become a mere garage and how Daniel stopped paying attention to her.

After a string of mistakes in which the thieves outsmart the police time and time again, the journalist is kidnapped. It is revealed that the journalist is the leader of the Santa Claus gang. The police go in search, but Emilien is captured after another botched attempt to arrest them. The journalist sets a trap; she leaves Emilien tied to a chair in an old warehouse, directly in the path of a giant ball which will crush him five minutes later.

At the last moment, Daniel rushes in with his taxi and rescues him. They track the gang to their hideout in the Swiss mountains, where the journalist and her accomplices are arrested by a crack team of Alpine troops. Gibert lands in an ice-bound lake after leaping from an aircraft with them. Petra gives birth, Daniel proposes to Lilly, and a Gibert is seen being pushed around in a wheelchair covered in ice.

Cast

 Samy Naceri as Daniel Morales 
 Frédéric Diefenthal as Émilien Coutant-Kerbalec
 Marion Cotillard as Lilly Bertineau
 Bernard Farcy as the Commissaire Gérard Gibert 
 Edouard Montoute as Alain 
 Emma Wiklund as Petra 
 Bai Ling as Qiu 
 Jean-Christophe Bouvet as the General Edmond Bertineau 
 Patrice Abbou as Rachid 
 Claude Sese as Planton
 Alain David as the Minister 
 Sylvester Stallone had an uncredited cameo at the beginning of the film as a passenger to the airport. Since he cannot speak French, his voice was dubbed by his official French dub-over artist, Alain Dorval.

Production
TBA

Reception
TBA

Other media

Video games
Taxi 3 – Based on Taxi 3. Released in 2003

In popular culture
The opening titles are an amusing spoof of those featured in the movies starring James Bond, and there are several nods to the 007 canon throughout the film, e.g. Daniel's rotating number plate and the ski chase at the film's climax.

References

External links
 
 
 
 

2002 films
2000s action comedy films
2000s crime comedy films
2000s buddy comedy films
Films about organized crime in France
Films directed by Gérard Krawczyk
Films produced by Luc Besson
Films set in Marseille
French buddy comedy films
French pregnancy films
2000s French-language films
French action comedy films
French crime comedy films
French sequel films
Taxi (film series)
2000s chase films
2000s French films